Shtil may refer to:

 Shtil', a space launch vehicle
 Shtil, a heavy metal song by Russian band Aria
 Schtiel, a rock song and cover of the Aria song by Till Lindemann and Richard Kruspe